The 2021 All-Ireland Senior Camogie Championship was the premier inter-county competition of the 2021 camogie season.

The winners received the O'Duffy Cup. Galway defeated Cork in the final to claim their 4th title.

Teams

Twelve county teams competed in the Senior Championship. 22 lower-ranked county teams competed in the Intermediate and Junior Championships.

Format

Group stage

The twelve teams were drawn into three group, each containing four teams. Each team played each other team in its group once. Two points were awarded for a win and one for a draw.

Knock-out stage

The runners-up in groups 1, 2 and 3 and the winners of one group played in the quarter-finals. The other 2 group winners got a bye to the semi-final stage.

The bottom team in each group had to play-off to decide the team relegated to the Intermediate Championship.

Group stage
Group games took place between 17 July and 1 August.

Group 1

Group 2

Group 3

Relegation play-off

Knockout stage

References

External links
 Camogie Association

2021 in camogie
2021